Rockmore is a surname. Notable people with the surname include:

 Clara Rockmore (1911–1998), Lithuanian electronic musician
 Noel Rockmore (1928–1995), American painter, draughtsman, and sculptor
 Tom Rockmore (born 1942), American philosopher

See also
 Mount Rockmore, music album